The Alliance for Young Artists & Writers is a nonprofit organization which manages the annual Scholastic Art & Writing Awards, a competition which recognizes talented young artists and writers from across the United States.

Scholastic Art & Writing Awards
The competition begins at a regional level, with students receiving a variety of regional awards. The submissions which receive "Gold Key" awards are then judged at the national level.

History 
In 1923, Maurice R. Robinson, of Scholastic Corporation established the Scholastic Awards.

In 1994, the Alliance for Young Artists & Writers was established to administer the Awards.

Scholarships 
Exceptional artwork and literature submitted to the Scholastic Art & Writing Awards are awarded scholarships. Scholarships usually include monetary prizes as well as free or reduced-tuition art and writing programs. The 2021 scholarships include: Best-in-Grade Award, Civic Expression Award, New York Life Award, One Earth Award, Portfolio Awards, The Alliance/ACT-SO Journey Award, The Herblock Award for Editorial Cartoon, and Ray Bradbury Award for Science Fiction & Fantasy.

National Student Poets Program
The program links the National Student Poets with audiences and neighborhood resources such as museums and libraries, and other community-anchor institutions and builds upon the Alliance for Young Artists & Writers' long-standing work with educators and creative teens through the prestigious Scholastic Art & Writing Awards. The Poets’ appointment events are hosted in cooperation with the Library of Congress in Washington, D.C., and held in conjunction with the National Book Festival.

Jurors
The selection panels for both regional and national levels of the Scholastic Art & Writing Awards are composed of artists, writers, curators, critics, educators, and professionals from the nation’s leading creative industries, some of whom are alums of the Scholastic Awards. Notable past jurors include Robert Frost, Langston Hughes, David Sedaris, Judy Blume, Bill Murray, Philip-Lorca diCorcia, Mary Ellen Mark, William Saroyan, Sergio Troncoso, Frank McCourt, Kiki Smith, George Plimpton, Esmeralda Santiago, Tatiana von Fürstenberg, Madeleine L’Engle, Faith Ringgold, Billy Collins, Edward Sorel, Edwidge Danticat, Donald Lipski, Carolyn Forché, Ned Vizzini, and Michael Bierut. Panelists look for works that best exemplify originality, technical skill, and the emergence of a personal voice or vision.

Notable alumni
Source:

 Richard Anuszkiewicz
 Alan Arkin
 Richard Avedon
 John Baldessari 
 Kevin Bales
 Peter Beagle
 Harry Bertoia
 Michael Bierut
 Mel Bochner
 Garrett Børns
 Stan Brakhage
 Ken Burns
 Truman Capote
 John Currin
 Maureen Daly
 Paul Brooks Davis
 Joe DiPietro
 Lena Dunham
 Abdi Farah
 Frances Farmer
 Carolyn Forché
 Hugh Gallagher
 Myla Goldberg
 Red Grooms
 Richard Haas
 Erik Madigan Heck
 Robert Indiana
 Luis Jiménez
 Jaida Jones
 Ezra Jack Keats
 Stephen King
 Jacob Landau
 Hughie Lee-Smith
 Richard Linklater
 Donald Lipski
 John Lithgow
 Bernard Malamud
 Joyce Maynard
 Robert McCloskey
 Sue Miller
 Audrey Niffenegger
 Ryan Jude Novelline
 Joyce Carol Oates
 Tom Otterness
 Gary Panter
 Philip Pearlstein
 Sylvia Plath
 Zac Posen
 Robert Redford
 Thane Rosenbaum
 David Salle
 John Howard Sanden
 Winfield Townley Scott
 Mason Shefa
 Edward Sorel
 Jean Stafford
 Timothy Tau
 Robert Trebor
 Cy Twombly
 John Updike
 Ned Vizzini
 Kay WalkingStick
 Andy Warhol
 Idelle Weber
 Charles White
 Terry Winters
 Roger Zelazny

References

External links
 Alliance for Young Artists & Writers
 National Student Poets Program

1994 establishments in New York City
Arts organizations established in 1994
Non-profit organizations based in New York City
Scholarships in the United States